Dennis Kruppke (born 1 April 1980) is a German former professional footballer who played as a midfielder or forward.

Career
Kruppke was born in Münster. He joined Bundesliga side SC Freiburg from VfB Lübeck in 2003. He made his debut in the German first-tier on 2 August 2003, in a match against Bayer Leverkusen.

He returned to Lübeck for a six-month loan in January 2007. After this loan he played again for SC Freiburg, but was transferred to Eintracht Braunschweig, then playing in the Regionalliga Nord, in January 2008. Kruppke went on to captain the team to promotions to the 2. Bundesliga in 2011 and the Bundesliga in 2013. After eight seasons in Braunschweig, he retired at the end of the 2014–15 season due to a knee injury.

Honours
 Northern German Sportsperson of the Year (Nordsportler des Jahres): 2012

References

External links
 

1980 births
Living people
Sportspeople from Münster
German footballers
Association football midfielders
Association football forwards
Bundesliga players
2. Bundesliga players
3. Liga players
VfB Lübeck players
SC Freiburg players
SC Freiburg II players
Eintracht Braunschweig players
Eintracht Braunschweig II players
Footballers from North Rhine-Westphalia